Birger Danielsson is a retired Swedish footballer. Danielsson made 28 Svenska Serien and Allsvenskan appearances for Djurgården and scored 6 goals.

References

Swedish footballers
Djurgårdens IF Fotboll players
Svenska Serien players
Allsvenskan players
Association footballers not categorized by position
Year of birth missing